Isabel Mallory Aco Bravo (born 8 January 1994) is a Peruvian karateka. She won one of the bronze medals in the women's kumite +68 kg event at the 2019 Pan American Games held in Lima, Peru.

Career 

At the 2013 World Games held in Cali, Colombia, she won the bronze medal in the women's kumite +68 kg event. In the same year, she also won the gold medal in the women's kumite +68 kg event at the 2013 Bolivarian Games held in Trujillo, Peru.

In 2018, she won the gold medal in the women's kumite +68 kg event at the South American Games held in Cochabamba, Bolivia. In 2021, she competed at the World Olympic Qualification Tournament held in Paris, France hoping to qualify for the 2020 Summer Olympics in Tokyo, Japan.

Achievements

References

External links 
 

Living people
1994 births
Place of birth missing (living people)
Peruvian female karateka
Pan American Games medalists in karate
Pan American Games bronze medalists for Peru
Medalists at the 2019 Pan American Games
Karateka at the 2019 Pan American Games
South American Games gold medalists for Peru
South American Games medalists in karate
Competitors at the 2018 South American Games
Competitors at the 2013 World Games
World Games bronze medalists
World Games medalists in karate
National University of San Marcos alumni
20th-century Peruvian women
21st-century Peruvian women